West Covina High School (WCHS) is a four-year comprehensive secondary school located in West Covina, California, USA.

History
West Covina High School opened in 1956 on the old Covina High School campus on Citrus Ave. and Puente Ave. as the Spartans. In 1957, the school moved to its new campus, which was built on an old cabbage patch, on Cameron Ave. and Fernwood St. Blue and white were the school colors. The Spartans were led by Principal Maurice Wooden, brother of the legendary UCLA Bruins men's basketball coach John Wooden. The first class graduated in 1958.

In 1988, West Covina Unified School District merged Edgewood High School and West Covina High School, bringing all students to its current campus. The new mascot became the Bulldog and maroon and gold were chosen as the new school colors.

In 2005, WCHS became fully accredited by the Western Association of Schools and Colleges and a California Distinguished School.

Demographics
There has been a decrease in the percentage of white and African American students over the years with an increase in the number and percentage of Hispanic students. There is a large number of Asian American students, who are of mainly Filipino Chinese, Taiwanese and Vietnamese descent.

The ethnicity of the school in 2010-2011 was:
Hispanic/Latino: 2,078
Asian: 468
White: 210
African American: 125
American Indian/Alaska Native: 2
Pacific Islander: 7
Not reported: 2
Total: 2,892

Athletics
The Bulldog athletic teams compete in the Valle Vista League of the CIF Southern Section.
 Previous Leagues: Sierra, San Antonio, Hacienda

League Championships
 American Football: 1993, 2005, 2006, 2008, 2010, 2011, 2012
 Boys' Cross Country: 2006, 2007, 2008, 2009, 2010, 2012, 2020
 Girls' Tennis: Individual Champion 2010, 2011, 2012, 2013
 Boys' Basketball: 2006, 2007, 2009
 Boys' Soccer: 2009
 Wrestling: 1999, 2004, 2005, 2006, 2007, 2010, 2011
 Badminton: Individual Champion 2009, 2010
 Softball: 2004, 2005, 2009
 Track & Field: Girls 2009

CIF Championships
 American Football: 2004, 2010, 2011
 Wrestling: 2006, 2007, 2011

State championships
 Girls' Wrestling: 2011
Girls' Wrestling: 2012

Activities

In 2006, the FIRST Robotics Competition team, Robotics Alliance of West Covina (RAWC) took first place in the Southern California Regional Competition and took second place in the FIRST Championship in Atlanta, Georgia. In 2008, the team achieved first in the San Diego Regional Competition and third in the World in the Championship in Atlanta. They were undefeated in their division (Newton Division) and lost to the first place team in Atlanta.

In March 2008, the All Male Hip Hop dance team took first place at the United Spirit Association Dance/Drill National Competition in the Medium Hip Hop and All Male divisions. In March 2009, it once again took first place at the USA Nationals Dance/Drill Competition in the All Male Division, which led to a back-to-back National Championship. In March 2010, the All Male Hip Hop dance team won another first place in the All Male Division, which had led the team to a 3-peat National Championship title.

In March 2010, 2017 and 2018 the Dance/Drill team took first place at the USA National Dance/Drill Competition in the Small Military Division.

During winter 2008, the Indoor Drumline won the ADLA Scholastic Open Championship with their show entitled "Teknologik". In 2009, it won the silver medal in the ADLA Scholastic World Championship with a show entitled "Imagine", and in 2010 took the gold again with its show "From the Ashes".

Yearly API

Notable alumni
 Tom Brunansky - graduated 1978, major league baseball outfielder
 Joey Eischen - graduated 1988, major league baseball pitcher
 Justin Lehr - major league baseball pitcher
 Nia Peeples - graduated 1980, actress
 Keith Smith - graduated 1982, retired professional basketball player.
 Walter Thurmond - graduated 2005, National Football League defensive back, Super Bowl XLVIII winner
 Bob Zany - graduated 1979, comedian
 Bill Stoneman - graduated 1962, major league pitcher, general manager of Los Angeles Angels
 Derek Tennell - graduated 1982, retired NFL football player
 Steve Myer - graduated 1972, retired NFL football player
 Emily Rios - graduated 2006, actress
 Sidney Jones - graduated 2014, NFL football player for the Philadelphia Eagles, Super Bowl LII winner
 Christian Yeung - graduated 2005, basketball player and actor
 Sienna Lalau - graduated 2018, choreographer and dancer

References

External links
 Official website

West Covina Unified School District
High schools in Los Angeles County, California
1956 establishments in California
Educational institutions established in 1956
Public high schools in California